Barłogi  is a village in the administrative district of Gmina Kurów, within Puławy County, Lublin Voivodeship, in eastern Poland.

The village has a population of 140. Antoni Sułek - a professor of sociology of  University of Warsaw (UW) was born in Barłogi (1945).

References

Villages in Puławy County